Sir Alexander Mackenzie Provincial Park is a provincial park in British Columbia, Canada.  Located at the mouth of Elcho Harbour on Dean Channel, it enshrines the farthest point west reached by Alexander Mackenzie in 1793 and the rock he marked to commemorate his journey.

The Park and monument can only be reached by boat. If seas are very calm, a float plane landing may be possible. There are no facilities at this park. The nearest communities are Bella Coola to the southeast and Ocean Falls to the west.

References

External links
 BC Parks webpage
 

Provincial parks of British Columbia
Central Coast of British Columbia
History of British Columbia
Protected areas established in 1926
1926 establishments in British Columbia
National Historic Sites in British Columbia